Chionodes trico is a moth in the family Gelechiidae. It is found in North America, where it has been recorded from Yukon and Alberta to New Mexico, Arizona and South Dakota.

References

Chionodes
Moths described in 1999
Moths of North America